Ismail Faruqi bin Asha'ri (born 15 October 1986 in Kuala Terengganu, Terengganu) is a Malaysian footballer currently playing for Terengganu II in Malaysia Premier League. He plays as a central midfielder and sometimes attacking midfielder for the squad.

He made his debut for Malaysia national football team in the 2014 FIFA World Cup qualifying match against Singapore on 23 July 2011. On 2015, Malaysian former couch, Dato Ong Kim Swee call him for the friendly against Laos that they win 3-1 and for the 2018 World Cup Qualifiers against Timor Leste that they win 1-0.

External links
 

1986 births
Living people
Malaysian footballers
Malaysia international footballers
Terengganu FC players
People from Terengganu
Malaysian people of Malay descent
Association football midfielders